Utricularia viscosa is a small to medium-sized perennial, terrestrial or subaquatic carnivorous plant that belongs to the genus Utricularia and is the only member of Utricularia sect. Sprucea. U. viscosa is native to Central America (Belize and Nicaragua) and South America (Brazil, French Guiana, Guyana, Suriname, Trinidad, and Venezuela). It was originally named by Richard Spruce and formally described by Daniel Oliver in 1860. In 1986, Peter Taylor placed this species in its own section, Sprucea, which was named in honor of Richard Spruce.

See also 
 List of Utricularia species

References

External links 
 First known photographs of U. viscosa

Carnivorous plants of Central America
Carnivorous plants of South America
Flora of Belize
Flora of Brazil
Flora of French Guiana
Flora of Guyana
Flora of Nicaragua
Flora of Suriname
Flora of Trinidad and Tobago
Flora of Venezuela
viscosa
Taxa named by Richard Spruce
Taxa named by Daniel Oliver